Robert Schuman Foundation may refer to:
Robert Schuman Foundation (European People's Party)
Robert Schuman Foundation (France), established 1991
Polish Robert Schuman Foundation, established 1991